The Priory Theatre is an amateur theatre building and company located in Kenilworth, Warwickshire, England. There are 120 seats in a circle and stall layout.

The original company were named the Kenilworth Players and formed in 1932. Based in a local hotel they however only lasted until 1939 and the outbreak of World War II. In 1945 the players purchased a former Christadelphian/Unitarian chapel on Rosemary Hill near Abbey Fields and the ruined St Mary's Abbey. This building, in the Perpendicular Gothic Revival style, dates from 1816. The 'new' theatre, still their current location, was opened on 8 April 1946. Improvements to the building since then include the installation of the circle in 1947, additional changing rooms and a kitchen in 1952 and the current foyer was built in 1965.

In 1968 the company changed their name to the Priory Theatre Company and four years later were admitted to the Little Theatre Guild of Great Britain. A devastating fire partially gutted the building in 1976 but productions started again just two years earlier. In 1979 the group purchased the former National School building 100 yards away for rehearsals and wardrobe room. The foyer was most recently re-development in 1999 and the dressing rooms in 2006.

References

Amateur theatre companies in England
Theatres in Warwickshire
Kenilworth
Little_Theatre_Guild_of_Great_Britain